Greenock Juniors Football Club are a Scottish football club based in Greenock, Inverclyde. The club were decanted for a short period of time as the Stadium received multi-million pound upgrades in preparation for the 2014 Commonwealth Games.

History
In season 1959–60 Greenock made their only appearance in the final of the Scottish Junior Cup. They were beaten 3–1 by St Andrews United at Hampden Park, Glasgow in front of a crowd of 34,603. Their quarter-final tie against Johnstone Burgh earlier in the competition attracted a record attendance of 8,000 to Ravenscraig Stadium.

Following a period of instability former player Thomas Molloy was appointed as manager in June 2017, and was assisted by former Kilmarnock FC and Greenock Morton Central Defender Shaun Dillon, Owen Archdeacon and goalkeeping coach Gavin Pick. Thomas and his management team left the club in the summer of 2021 to join West of Scotland Premier League team, Kilbirnie Ladeside. 

The actor Martin Compston played briefly for the club following his release from Greenock Morton.

Honours
 Central League Championship winners: 1960–61, 1965–66
 Central League Division Two winners: 1997–98
 Central League Cup winners: 1960–61, 1965–66, 1966–67
 Pompey Cup winners: 1965–66
 Renfrewshire Junior Cup winners: 1959–60, 1960–61, 1962–63, 1963–64, 1966–67
 Erskine Hospital Charity Cup winners: 1959–60
 West Central League First Division winners: 2013

References

External links 
 Club Website
 Scottish Football Historical Archive
 Non-League Scotland

Football clubs in Scotland
Scottish Junior Football Association clubs
Football in Inverclyde
Association football clubs established in 1956
1956 establishments in Scotland
Greenock
West of Scotland Football League teams